2013 Regional League Division 2  Central & Eastern  Region is the 5th season of the League competition since its establishment in 2009. It is in the third tier of the Thai football league system.

Changes from Last Season

Team Changes

Promoted Clubs

Ayutthaya, Rayong and Trat were promoted to the 2013 Thai Division 1 League.

Relegated Clubs

Chanthaburi and JW Rangsit were relegated from the 2012 Thai Division 1 League

Relocated Clubs
Thai Airways-Look Isan  relocated to the Regional League Central-East Division from the Bangkok Area Division 2012.

Ang Thong, Muangkan, Phetchaburi, Prachuap Khiri Khan, Looktabfah F.C.  have all been moved into the Central & Western Division 2013

Expansion Clubs
Kabin United Pluak Daeng and Phan Thong joined the newly expanded league setup.

Withdrawn Clubs

 Lopburi F.C.  have withdrawn from the 2013 campaign.
 Kabin City have withdrawn from the 2013 campaign.

Renamed Clubs

 J.W. Rangsit renamed Rangsit University.

Stadium and locations

League table

References

External links
 Football Association of Thailand

Regional League Central-East Division seasons
Cen